Paul Beilby Lawley Thompson, 1st Baron Wenlock (1 July 1784 – 9 May 1852), born Paul Beilby Lawley, was an English nobleman and Whig politician.

Life
Thompson was born Paul Beilby Lawley, the youngest son of Sir Robert Lawley, 5th Baronet and Jane Thompson.

In 1820, he inherited the estate of Escrick in Yorkshire from his uncle, Richard Thompson, and changed his name to Paul Beilby Thompson. He entered Parliament for Wenlock, in Shropshire in 1828, and retained the seat until 1832. He then stood for the East Riding of Yorkshire, and was member there until 1837. In 1839, he was created Baron Wenlock, of Wenlock in the County of Salop, a title previously held by his eldest brother Robert, who died without issue. Upon ennoblement, he was given a Royal Licence to change his name to Paul Beilby Lawley Thompson, and allow his heirs to carry only the Lawley surname.

He married Caroline Neville (d. 1868), daughter of Richard Griffin, 2nd Baron Braybrooke, by whom he had five children:
Beilby Richard Lawley, 2nd Baron Wenlock (1818–1880)
Robert Neville Lawley (30 August 1819 – 1 November 1891), captain in the 2nd Life Guards and later military historian, married Georgina Emily Somerset, daughter of Lord Edward Somerset, and died without issue
Rev. Stephen Willoughby Lawley (1823 – c. 1901), rector at Escrick 1848–1868 and sub-dean of York 1852–1862.
Francis Charles Lawley (1825–1901), journalist and politician
Jane Lawley (1820 - 1900), married James Archibald Stuart-Wortley

References

External links 
 

Wenlock, Paul Thompson, 1st Baron
Wenlock, Paul Thompson, 1st Baron
Wenlock, Paul Thompson, 1st Baron
Wenlock, Paul Thompson, 1st Baron
Members of the Parliament of the United Kingdom for English constituencies
Whig (British political party) MPs
UK MPs 1826–1830
UK MPs 1830–1831
UK MPs 1831–1832
UK MPs 1832–1835
UK MPs 1835–1837
UK MPs who were granted peerages
Peers of the United Kingdom created by Queen Victoria